Jamie Blatnick (born June 24, 1989) is a former American football linebacker. He played college football at Oklahoma State.

Professional career

Denver Broncos
Blatnick signed with the Denver Broncos as an undrafted free agent following the 2012 NFL Draft.

Buffalo Bills
Blatnick signed with the Buffalo Bills during the 2013 offseason. He was released from the Bills on October 15, 2013.

Los Angeles Kiss
Blatnick was assigned to the Los Angeles Kiss of the Arena Football League on November 1, 2013. He was placed on recallable reassignment by the Kiss in January 2014.

References

External links
NFL Combine profile
Oklahoma State Cowboys bio

1989 births
Living people
American football defensive ends
Oklahoma State Cowboys football players
Denver Broncos players
Buffalo Bills players
Los Angeles Kiss players